Nuff Creek is a  stream in San Mateo County, California which is a tributary of Pilarcitos Creek. It has an elevation of 197 feet and is most frequently used as a kayaking location. The closest major town is Half Moon Bay.

References

See also
List of watercourses in the San Francisco Bay Area

Rivers of San Mateo County, California
Rivers of Northern California